Theodor Wolff Park (German: Theodor-Wolff-Park) is a public park in Kreuzberg, Berlin, Germany.

See also
 List of parks and gardens in Berlin

External links

 

Friedrichshain-Kreuzberg
Parks in Berlin